Bhoopathi Ranga is a 1970 Indian Kannada language drama film written and directed by Geethapriya. It stars Rajkumar, Udaya Chandrika and Renuka. The film's story was written and produced by Bhaskar Movies. The future director H. R. Bhargava worked as an associate director in this film.

Cast 
 Rajkumar 
 Udaya Chandrika
 Renuka
 Rathna
 Narasimharaju 
 Dinesh
 Ashwath Narayan
 Prem Dinakar
 C. R. Sampath Kumaran

Soundtrack 
The music of the film was composed by Vijaya Bhaskar and lyrics for the soundtrack written by Geethapriya. The song "Hakkiyu Haaruthide" and the cabaret number "Rasika Rasika" are considered one of the most evergreen songs and popular songs in Kannada cinema.

Track list

See also
 Kannada films of 1970

References 

1970 films
1970s Kannada-language films
Indian black-and-white films
Indian drama films
Films scored by Vijaya Bhaskar
Films directed by Geethapriya
1970 drama films